Ishikawa TV Co., Ltd.(石川テレビ放送株式会社, Ishikawa Terebi Hōsō Kabushiki Gaisha), also known as ITC, is a Japanese broadcast network affiliated with the Fuji News Network and Fuji Network System. Their headquarters are located in Ishikawa Prefecture.

History
1969  April: It was set up as Ishikawa Prefecture's second broadcasting station.
2006  July: its Digital terrestrial television broadcasts were started from its Kanazawa main station.

Stations

Analog Stations 
Kanazawa(Main Station) JOIH-TV 37ch
Nanao 55ch

Digital Stations(ID:8)
Kanazawa(Main Station) JOIH-DTV 16ch

Programs

Rival Stations 
Hokuriku Broadcasting Company(MRO)
TVkanazawa(KTK)
Hokuriku Asahi Broadcasting(HAB)

Other Links
Ishikawa TV Co.,ltd

Fuji News Network
Television stations in Japan
Television channels and stations established in 1969
Mass media in Kanazawa, Ishikawa